Catamount Ski Area is a ski resort located on Mount Fray of the Taconic Mountains in Hillsdale, New York and South Egremont, Massachusetts. Catamount is one of three ski areas in the southern Berkshires;  the others are Butternut in Great Barrington, and Otis Ridge in Otis. It is  one of the few remaining family-owned ski areas in New England.  In addition, Catamount is home to one of the largest youth ski race programs in the Northeast.

History
Fray Mountain was discovered as a potential ski area by John (Jack) Falconer Fisher in 1937/38. After earning his pilot’s license at the age of 16, Fisher flew over mountains in the region, imagining where he might create either a golf course or a ski area. Jack was from nearby Salisbury, CT, and had helped bring Lime Rock Race Track and the Salisbury Ski Jump to fruition. He had many Scandinavian friends who were ski jumpers and skiers. After talking with his friends he decided to buy a farm (Fray), and called it Catamount. In 1937/38 Jack and his friends camped out for the summer at the base of the mountain, creating trails and deciding on a vision for what would become one of the first ski areas in the country.

Catamount opened for business in 1939, with three rope tows, run by a car engine with a bull wheel attached and a rope around it, pulling skier up the hill.

Many skiers came up from New York City on the train that then ran to Hillsdale, New York. When the skiers arrived, trucks with hay bales in them for seating met the arriving skiers and delivered them to Catamount.

In 1953 Jack married Florence (Flukie) Kendall from New York City and they had two children, Katherine and Barrie. In 1958 Florence started the ski shop.

The lodge was decorated with two large fireplaces, a gravel floor, and picnic bench tables. Additions over the next 20 years included the Ski Cat Club (modeled after "Club 10" at Sugarbush Ski Area), a racing trail with a race shed for the racers, snowmaking, four chairlifts, one T-Bar, and one J-Bar.

Bill Gilbert and Don Edwards purchased Catamount in 1974 and took over management, adding more trails and increasing snowmaking 25 to 98 percent. After they retired, their sons, Tom Gilbert and Rich Edwards took over management. In 2006, the summit double chairlift was replaced with a fixed-grip quad chairlift from Belleayre Mountain Ski Center.

In May 2018 the Schaefer family of Charlemont MA, longtime owners/managers of Berkshire East Mountain Resort, purchased Catamount Ski Area. During the 2018-19 season, the main Berkshire Lodge was renovated and a new triple chair was installed on the Massachusetts side. In the summer of 2018, Catamount introduced the Zip Tour on its Catamonster, the longest zipline in America.

In the 2019-20 ski season, the new Catamount Lodge opened, with additional seating, a store, and ticketing operations. Four new trails (with snowmaking) also opened with varying difficulty.

During the 2020-21 season the new Catamount Lodge began offering food services, with additional seating in its second floor. The old Glade double chair was removed, making way for a used triple chair in its place. Construction of this new chairlift began construction in the summer of 2021. A new trail called "Lookout" rated as a blue square/intermediate also opened with snowmaking.

In addition to the new Glade triple, a new quad chair will replace the old "Catamount Double" during the 2021/2022 season. Other additions include more snowmaking, a new snowtubing park, a redesigned learning area, and more dining options.

Ticketing
In 2018, RFID gates from Axess were installed and the Catamount Direct card was introduced. Catamount is one of the first smaller ski areas in the northeast to install this technology. Catamount is part of the Berkshire Summit pass, a pass that combines Berkshire East season pass with Catamount. In 2020 it was announced that Bousquet would join the pass after the sale with Mill Town Capital.

Berkshire Summit Pass types 

Catamount is also part of the Indy Pass which is an affordable multi-mountain pass that promotes visitation to smaller resorts around the U.S.

Trails
Skiable area: 
43 trails
Longest trail –  Ridge Run to Upper and Lower Promenade

99% of the trails have the ability to support snowmaking, with a glade as the only exception.

(m) – Trail with moguls most of the time when conditions provide
(n) – Night skiing (on select days during the core season)
(g) – Glade Terrain (no snowmaking)
(r) – Removed due to other runs or structures in the makings
(nt) – Newest trail on the mountain

Lifts
There are eight total lifts at Catamount, all of which ranging from age, length, and value. Catamount WAS home to two of the last remaining SLI double chairlifts in the world, and the only two in the northeast. However, these chairlifts have been replaced with an all new triple and quad chairlift in the 2021/2022 season.

Lodges
Berkshire Lodge: The lodge is the original lodge and includes food services, tavern, restrooms, rentals, and seating. It is located to the left side of the Catamount Chair
Catamount Lodge: Opened in 2019, this is the new lodge that houses food services, offices, ticketing, shop, restrooms, and seating. It is located in front of the Kids Cat carpet.
Taconic Lodge: This is a temporary lodge with a shop, restrooms, and seating. It is located at the bottom of the mountain near the Ridge Quad.

References

Buildings and structures in Berkshire County, Massachusetts
Egremont, Massachusetts
Ski areas and resorts in New York (state)
Sports in Berkshire County, Massachusetts
Taconic Mountains
Tourist attractions in Columbia County, New York
Tourist attractions in Berkshire County, Massachusetts
1939 establishments in Massachusetts
1939 establishments in New York (state)